Adaptive behavior is behavior that enables a person (usually used in the context of children) to cope in their environment with greatest success and least conflict with others. This is a term used in the areas of psychology and special education. Adaptive behavior relates to everyday skills or tasks that the "average" person is able to complete, similar to the term life skills.

Nonconstructive or disruptive social or personal behaviors can sometimes be used to achieve a constructive outcome. For example, a constant repetitive action could be re-focused on something that creates or builds something. In other words, the behavior can be adapted to something else.

In contrast, maladaptive behavior is a type of behavior that is often used to reduce one's anxiety, but the result is dysfunctional and non-productive. For example, avoiding situations because you have unrealistic fears may initially reduce your anxiety, but it is non-productive in alleviating the actual problem in the long term. Maladaptive behavior is frequently used as an indicator of abnormality or mental dysfunction, since its assessment is relatively free from subjectivity. However, many behaviors considered moral can be maladaptive, such as dissent or abstinence.

Adaptive behavior reflects an individual's social and practical competence to meet the demands of everyday living.

Behavioral patterns change throughout a person's development, life settings and social constructs, evolution of personal values, and the expectations of others. It is important to assess adaptive behavior in order to determine how well an individual functions in daily life: vocationally, socially and educationally.

Examples
 A child born with cerebral palsy will most likely have a form of hemiparesis or hemiplegia (the weakening, or loss of use, of one side of the body). In order to adapt to one's environment, the child may use these limbs as helpers, in some cases even adapt the use of their mouth and teeth as a tool used for more than just eating or conversation.
 Frustration from lack of the ability to verbalize one's own needs can lead to tantrums. In addition, it may lead to the use of signs or sign language to communicate needs.

Core problems
Limitations in self-care skills and social relationships, as well as behavioral excesses, are common characteristics of individuals with mental disabilities. Individuals with mental disabilities—who require extensive supports—are often taught basic self-care skills such as dressing, eating, and hygiene. Direct instruction and environmental supports, such as added prompts and simplified routines, are necessary to ensure that deficits in these adaptive areas do not limit one's quality of life.

Most children with milder forms of mental disabilities learn how to take care of their basic needs, but they often require training in self-management skills to achieve the levels of performance necessary for eventual independent living. Making and sustaining personal relationships present significant challenges for many persons with mental disabilities. Limited cognitive processing skills, poor language development, and unusual or inappropriate behaviors can seriously impede interactions with others. Teaching students with mental disabilities appropriate social and interpersonal skills is an important function of special education. Students with mental disabilities often exhibit behavior problems than students who do not have the similar disabilities. Some behaviors observed by students with mental disabilities are difficulty accepting criticism, limited self-control, and inappropriate behaviors. The greater the severity of the mental disabilities, generally the higher the incidence of behavioral problems.

Problems with assessing long-term and short-term adaptation
One problem with assessments of adaptive behavior is that a behavior that appears adaptive in the short run can be maladaptive in the long run and vice versa. For example, in the case of a group with rules that insist on drinking harmful amounts of alcohol both abstinence and moderate drinking (moderate as defined by actual health effects, not by socially constructed rules) may seem maladaptive if assessments are strictly short term, but an assessment that focuses on long-term survival would instead find that it was adaptive and that it was obedience under the drinking rule that was maladaptive. Such differences between short term effects and long-term effects in the context of harmful consequences of short-term compliance with destructive rules are argued by some researchers to show that assessments of adaptive behavior are not as unproblematic as is often assumed by psychiatry.

Adaptive behaviors in education
In education, adaptive behavior is defined as that which (1) meets the needs of the community of stakeholders (parents, teachers, peers, and later employers) and (2) meets the needs of the learner, now and in the future. Specifically, these behaviors include such things as effective speech, self-help, using money, cooking, and reading, for example.

Training in adaptive behavior is a key component of any educational program, but is critically important for children with special needs. The US Department of Education has allocated billions of dollars ($12.3 billion in 2008) for special education programs aimed at improving educational and early intervention outcomes for children with disabilities.
In 2001, the United States National Research Council published a comprehensive review of interventions for children and adults diagnosed with autism. The review indicates that interventions based on applied behavior analysis have been effective with these groups.

Adaptive behavior includes socially responsible and independent performance of daily activities. However, the specific activities and skills needed may differ from setting to setting. When a student is going to school, school and academic skills are adaptive. However, some of those same skills might be useless or maladaptive in a job settings, so the transition between school and job needs careful attention.

Specific skills
Adaptive behavior includes the age-appropriate behaviors necessary for people to live independently and to function safely and appropriately in daily life. Adaptive behaviors include life skills such as grooming, dressing, safety, food handling, working, money management, cleaning, making friends, social skills, and the personal responsibility expected of their age, social group and wealth group. Specifically relevant are community access skills and peer access and retention skills, and behaviors which act as barriers to such access. These are itemised below.

Community access skills
 Bus riding
 Independent walking
 Coin summation
 Ordering food in a restaurant
 Vending machine use
 Eating in public places
 Pedestrian safety

Peer access and retention
 Clothing selection skills
 Appropriate mealtime behaviors
 Toy play skills and playful activities
 Oral hygiene and tooth brushing
 Soccer play
Adaptive behaviors are considered to change due to the persons culture and surroundings. Professors have to delve into the students technical and comprehension skills to measure how adaptive their behavior is.

Barriers to access to peers and communities
 Diurnal bruxism
 Controlling rumination and vomiting
 Pica

Adaptive skills
Every human being must learn a set of skills that is beneficial for the environments and communities they live in. Adaptive skills are stepping stones toward accessing and benefiting from local or remote communities. This means that, in urban environments, to go to the movies, a child will have to learn to navigate through the town or take the bus, read the movie schedule, and pay for the movie. Adaptive skills allow for safer exploration because they provide the learner with an increased awareness of his/her surroundings and of changes in context, that require new adaptive responses to meet the demands and dangers of that new context. Adaptive skills may generate more opportunities to engage in meaningful social interactions and acceptance. Adaptive skills are socially acceptable and desirable at any age and regardless of gender (with the exception of gender specific biological differences such as menstrual care skills).

Learning adaptive skills
Adaptive skills encompass a range of daily situations and they usually start with a task analysis. The task analysis will reveal all the steps necessary to perform the task in the natural environment. The use of behavior analytic procedures has been documented, with children, adolescents and adults, under the guidance of behavior analysts and supervised behavioral technicians. The list of applications has a broad scope and it is in continuous expansion as more research is carried out in applied behavior analysis (see Journal of Applied Behavior Analysis, The Analysis of Verbal Behavior).

Practopoietic theory 
According to practopoietic theory, creation of adaptive behavior involves special, poietic interactions among different levels of system organization. These interactions are described on the basis of cybernetic theory in particular, good regulator theorem. In practopoietic systems, lower levels of organization determine the properties of higher levels of organization, but not the other way around. This ensures that lower levels of organization (e.g., genes) always possess cybernetically more general knowledge than the higher levels of organization—knowledge at a higher level being a special case of the knowledge at the lower level. At the highest level of organization lies the overt behavior. Cognitive operations lay in the middle parts of that hierarchy, above genes and below behavior. For behavior to be adaptive, at least three adaptive traverses are needed.

See also
 Adaptive Behavior – journal
 Character
 Evolutionary mismatch
 Vineland Social Maturity Scale

References

External links
 BACB (Behavior Analyst Certification Board)

Human behavior
Behavioral concepts
Developmental psychology
Evolutionary psychology